Life Flight is an air ambulance service operated by Geisinger Health System in Pennsylvania, United States. It has six operating bases. The air ambulance averages about 2,800 flights a year.

History
Life Flight was founded in 1983 and currently has a fleet of nine helicopters. Life Flight helicopters transport nearly 3,000 critically ill adult and pediatric patients each year across the region. Each crew consists of a pilot, flight nurse, flight paramedic and in certain circumstances, a flight physician or specialty neonatal transport nurse.

Operating bases
The company maintains bases at the following locations within Pennsylvania:

Selinsgrove - Penn Valley Airport Life Flight 1
State College – University Park Airport Life Flight 2
Avoca – Wilkes-Barre/Scranton International Airport Life Flight 3
Williamsport – Williamsport Regional Airport Life Flight 4
Minersville –  Goodwill Fire Department Life Flight 5
Lehighton – Jake Arner Memorial Airport Life Flight 6

Fleet

References

Air ambulance services in the United States
Medical and health organizations based in Pennsylvania